Lalkurti (literally  red shirt; referring to British Infantry "Red coats" from colonial era), is a locality in the heart of Rawalpindi cantonment in Pakistan. Places with the same name are also found in many other garrison cities of Pakistan and India, such as Peshawar, Lahore, Kanpur, Ambala, Meerut and Delhi.

Located to the south of Mall Road, Lalkurti Rawalpindi is a bazaar and a residential area from the British colonial era. The Lalkurti Bazaar area, formerly known as B I Bazaar (British Infantry Bazaar), is one of the busiest shopping areas of Rawalpindi cantonment.

The importance of Lalkurti in the history of Rawalpindi and Pakistan lies in its once being the hub of Pakistan's military and political activities, especially in the 1960s, when Rawalpindi served as the interim capital of Pakistan. The first session of the third National Assembly of Pakistan was held on 8 June 1962 at Ayub Hall, Lalkurti.

Population and demography 
Lalkurti has a population of around 200,000, which includes a majority of Punjabis/Pothoharis and a minority of Urdu speaking Mohajirs, Kashmiris and Pathans. A significant proportion of population has roots in East Punjab. Besides Muslim majority, a significant minority of Christians and a very small number of Hindus also reside at Lalkurti.

NUST building 
The building hosting the National University of Sciences and Technology, Pakistan (NUST), situated at the junction of Tameez-ud-din road (formerly called the Church road) and Mamoon Jee road, has a special historical significance. It was here in its Ayub Hall that the national legislative assembly sessions were held for some time in the 1960s.  The capital had been shifted from Karachi to Islamabad, but the building for the National Assembly of Pakistan had not been constructed by then and Rawalpindi served as the interim capital of the country. Ayub Hall has been named after Field Marshal Muhammad Ayub Khan, former president of Pakistan.

Schools and colleges 
 Army Public School and College
 Army Public College of Management Sciences (APCOMS)
 Military College of Signals 
 SLS Montessori
 F G Technical High School

Mosques, churches and temples 
There are six mosques and a couple of churches (St. Joseph's Cathedral and Christ Church) in the locality. The Christian minority and the Muslims have always lived in exemplary cohesion.

There are a few temples in Lalkurti which are a reminder of the Hindu population that lived here before partition. These temples are now in disuse and have been annexed into the neighbouring houses. The only temple being used for worship by a small presently existing Hindu population is the Balmik temple.

Museum 
 Army Museum is situated next to the CSD shopping complex, on Iftikhar Janjua road (formerly called Napier road). It exhibits vintage arms and ammunition, relics of past wars, war paintings and belongings of the Pakistani war heroes.

Transportation 
 Noor Khan Base is at a distance of ten kilometers.
 Daewoo Express Bus service terminal is at a distance of ten kilometers.

References 

 https://web.archive.org/web/20071024010023/http://www.na.gov.pk/history.htm
 http://www.dailytimes.com.pk/default.asp?page=2006%5C10%5C21%5Cstory_21-10-2006_pg11_7

Rawalpindi Cantonment
Populated places in Rawalpindi Cantonment